Public Art Festival is a biennial cultural framework, established in Athens, Greece by Andreas Fakis for the independent cultural organization Studio 4 in order to showcase forms of visual arts, conceptual art and film that fall into the public sphere.

Public Art Festival took place for the first time in Athens during September - October 2014, under the thematic of "Multiformity". The first edition of PAF was curated by Andreas Fakis, was spread out in three venues, namely: the Benaki Museum, the Greek Film Archive - Film Museum and Romantso and several outdoor locations, including Filopappou Hill, where the press conference of PAF took place and several walls, where murals were created and conserved.

References 

Public art
Contemporary art exhibitions
Greek contemporary art
Art biennials
2014 in art
Festivals established in 2014
2014 establishments in Greece